The Mountain Between Us may refer to:

The Mountain Between Us (film), a 2017 film adaptation of the novel, starring Idris Elba and Kate Winslet
The Mountain Between Us (novel), a 2011 romance-disaster novel written by Charles Martin